¡Q'Viva! The Chosen is an American reality television series. It premiered on January 28, 2012 in the United States in its Spanish-language version on Univision with a one-hour premiere and the first season concluded on April 28, 2012. It made its United States English language debut on FOX on March 3, 2012. ¡Q'Viva! The Chosen Live was the live stage show that was held in Las Vegas on May 26, 2012 as a culmination of the series.

Premise
The series follows superstars Jennifer Lopez and Marc Anthony as they travel throughout Latin America, along with director and choreographer, Jamie King, to discover the most authentic, genuine and talented entertainers and recruit them for their Las Vegas production of "the greatest Latin show ever". The talent that the trio are auditioning includes dancers, acrobats, singers, musicians among others.

Judges
 Jennifer Lopez 
 Marc Anthony 
 Jamie King

Broadcast

North American Broadcast 
Q'Viva premiered on January 28, 2012 in the United States in its Spanish-language version on Univision and composed of 12 one-hour episodes, concluded on April 28, 2012. The television show made its United States English-language debut on FOX on March 3, 2012 and was going to be aired in six with two-hour episodes, However, it had been cut from two-hour episodes to 90-minute episodes due to the show moving to late night. Then it was cancelled by Fox on May 14, 2012 after 6 episodes.

Reception
"!Q’Viva! The Chosen" the reality competition show for Univision, was watched by 2.2 million viewers on its debut according to Nielsen estimates.
That represents a 37% increase over what the network has averaged the previous three Saturday nights, according to network statisticians. Critics were enthusiastic that the show lacked the dramatic back stories and public humiliations that characterize other shows in the genre. Its English-language debut was not as well received. It got the same 2.2 million viewers, but lost to ABC, NBC and CBS in the time slot. Over 30 million people over the world watched Q'Viva.

Chosen talents / acts
List of artists that have appeared in Q’Viva The Chosen.

¡Q'Viva! The Chosen Live

¡Q'Viva! The Chosen Live was a live stage show that was held May 26, 2012 on the Las Vegas Strip in The Mandalay Bay Events Center at Mandalay Bay Resort and Casino in Las Vegas, Nevada.

Lawsuit 
In 2013, John Jacobs filed a $25 million lawsuit against both Lopez and Anthony, claiming that the two had stolen his idea for a reality show after he had pitched it to both of their production companies in 2007.

References

External links
 Official FOX website
 
 
 Official YouTube channel

2012 American television series debuts
2012 American television series endings
2010s American reality television series
2010s American drama television series
Univision original programming
Fox Broadcasting Company original programming
Singing talent shows
2010s American music television series
Music competitions in the United States
Talent shows
Jennifer Lopez
Marc Anthony